Depressaria peniculatella is a moth of the family Depressariidae. It is found in Spain and Portugal.

References

Moths described in 1922
Depressaria
Moths of Europe